Wilhelm Grimm (31 December 1889 – 21 July 1944) was a high-ranking member of the Nazi Party who was killed as a result of his supposed involvement in the July 20, 1944 plot to assassinate Hitler.

Early years
Grimm attended the non-commissioned officers' school in Fürstenfeldbruck from 1906 to 1909. Remaining in the military, he took part in the First World War, serving from 1914 and was released into civilian life as a leutnant in October 1919.

In 1920 Grimm joined the anti-Semitic German Socialist Party, of which Julius Streicher was a member. This party merged with the Nazis in 1922 and Grimm received membership number 10,134.

Nazi career
When the Nazi Party was re-established after being outlawed in the aftermath of the Beer Hall Putsch, Grimm rejoined on 27 February 1925. He became  (Local Group Leader) in Ansbach and in 1926  (County Leader). In May 1928 he was elected to the Bavarian . From 1 October 1928 to 1 March 1929 he was Gauleiter for Middle Franconia-West. However, when his Gau was merged with Streicher’s neighboring Gau (Nuremberg-Fürth) he became Deputy Gauleiter for Middle Franconia under Streicher.

In February 1932, Grimm was made an Associate Judge of USCHLA, the Nazi Party's investigative and mediation committee, a body that regulated internal party disputes. From 1 June 1932 Grimm was Chairman of the Second Chamber of USCHLA. In March 1933, he was elected to the Reichstag for electoral constituency 26, Franconia. On 3 June 1933 he was appointed Reichsleiter, the second highest rank in the Nazi Party.

Grimm joined the Schutzstaffel (SS) (membership no. 199,823) on 18 October 1933 with the rank of SS-Oberführer. He was promoted to SS-Brigadeführer on 24 December and on 27 January 1934 he was promoted to SS-Gruppenführer. He served on the staff of Reichsführer-SS Heinrich Himmler from April 1936. He retired from the Supreme Party Court on 9 March 1939. In August 1941, he served briefly in the German army on the Eastern Front as a battalion commander with the rank of Hauptmann before returning to Germany in 1943 due to illness. He resumed duties in Himmler's office, working on issues related to the war economy.

Death 
According to documents released by The Wilson Center in 2019, Grimm was implicated in the July 20, 1944 plot to assassinate Hitler, and killed the next day as part of reprisals. The document further states that, to protect the reputation of the SS, his cause of death was reported as a car accident and he was given an "honorable burial."

References

Bibliography

1889 births
1944 deaths
Gauleiters
German Army personnel of World War I
Members of the Reichstag of Nazi Germany
Nazi Party officials
Nazi Party politicians
Reichsleiters
Road incident deaths in Germany
SS-Gruppenführer
Burials in Bavaria